This is a list of cricketers who have played first-class, List A or Twenty20 cricket for Services cricket team. Seasons given are first and last seasons; the player did not necessarily play in all the intervening seasons. Players in bold have played international cricket.

C
Soumik Chatterjee, 2006/07-2016/17

D
Pratik Desai, 2010/11-2014/15

G
Anshul Gupta, ??-??

N
Shadab Nazar, ??-??

P
Rajat Paliwal, ??-??
Diwesh Pathania, ??-??
Deepak Punia, ??-??

S
Shashank Sharma, ??-??
Harcharan Singh
Avishek Sinha (born 18 October 1985), 2007/08–2017/18

V
Nakul Verma, ??-??

Y
Suraj Yadav, ??-??

References

Services cricketers